Yellow card may refer to:

 Yellow card (sport), shown in many sports after a rules infraction or, by analogy, a serious warning in other areas
 Yellowcard, an American alternative rock band
 Yellow Card Scheme, a United Kingdom initiative concerning reactions to medicines
 International Certificate of Vaccination or Prophylaxis, also known as Carte Jaune or Yellow Card, a vaccination certificate issued by the World Health Organization
 "Yellow card", colloquial name for the IBM System/370 Reference Summary booklet in the 1970s (earlier editions were colored green, or white for System/360, while subsequent releases were colored pink for XA and blue for ESA)
 A card issued to United Kingdom troops in Northern Ireland, listing the rules of engagement
 A card, used with certain contracted IATSE touring shows, informing downline venues of the number of traveling and local stagehands needed to mount and stage the production
Yellow ticket, a prostitution permit in the former Russian Empire
Standard American Yellow Card, a codification of the Standard American contract bridge bidding system by the American Contract Bridge League, originally printed on yellow paper